"Come Back Around" is a song by Feeder from the album Comfort in Sound. The phrase may also refer to:
"Come Back Round", a song by Matt Brouwer from Where's Our Revolution
"Come Back Round", a song by Dirty Heads from Super Moon